"Gluey, Gluey and the Ear Friend" is a single by New Zealand rock band Tall Dwarfs, released in 1998 with label number FN403. It contains the "Gluey Gluey" single and "The Ear Friend" EP.

Track listings

Gluey Gluey single
"Gluey Gluey (Single Mix)"

The Ear Friend EP
"Ice Breaker"
"Fragile (Guitar! Mix)"
"The Ear Friend (Trailer)"
"Foolish Hearts"
"The Ear Friend"

References

External links 
 

1998 songs
1998 singles
Tall Dwarfs songs
Dunedin Sound songs
Flying Nun Records singles
Song articles with missing songwriters